Women's gridiron football, more commonly known as women's tackle football, women's American football, women's Canadian football, or simply women's football, is a form of gridiron football (American or Canadian) played by women. Most leagues play by similar rules to the men's game. Women primarily play on a semi-professional or amateur level in the United States. Very few high schools or colleges offer the sport solely for women and girls. However, on occasion, it is permissible for a female player to join the otherwise male team.

History 
Women and girls were playing tackle football not long after the sport was invented in the 1880s, often in educational settings. For over 70 years, however, female involvement in football was reported in the media as a novel "spectacle". According to The Women's Football Encyclopedia, during this period, "powder bowl" events were "unusual and nonrecurring, and they were universally treated by the press as more farce than competitive football."

Early participation 
The first recorded instance of women playing football in the United States was in 1892, when students at the Philadelphia School of Design for Women played with "modified tackling rules". Starting in the 1890s, there were also numerous articles alluding to students at women's colleges playing football, at Wellesley College in Massachusetts and at Vassar College in New York. However, sports historian Katie Taylor questions the veracity of these accounts, and suggests that any games that did take place at Seven Sisters schools during these years were informal rather than competitive.

On November 21, 1896, a men's social club in New York set up a scrimmage between two teams of five women each, wearing the colors of Yale and Princeton, outside the casino at Sulzer's Harlem River Park, as entertainment before a masked ball. The Sun reported that after only a few plays, the local police captain had to step in to halt the event, after the crowd of men watching the women tackling each other started pushing, and it looked like someone could get crushed. In 1897, the San Francisco Grays played against the Oakland Browns, winning 20 to 8, in a women's football game played at the Velodrome under rugby rules.

1920s 
On December 8, 1922, Maui High School in the Territory of Hawaii held the first of two girls' football games that month with a team of sophomores and seniors playing against a team of juniors and freshman. The Maui News described it as "a game which afforded much amusement to the masculine element", but also noted that "The Hi girls proved that when it comes to grit, they're there with the goods." In 1925, a woman's football game played at San Jose State Teachers' College between two teams drawn from the school's gymnasium classes was covered by the Associated Press and The New York Times.

On November 6, 1926, the Frankford Yellow Jackets of Philadelphia, who went on to win the NFL championship that year, featured "Lady Yellow Jackets" as halftime entertainment during their game against the Chicago Cardinals, in front of an audience of 8,000. Although the NFL connection has led many to pinpoint this event as the start of women's football, a detailed account in the Philadelphia Public Ledger makes it clear that it was nothing more than a comedy act. The eleven Lady Yellow Jackets danced the Charleston, and the team they faced consisted of two old men. Furthermore, there is no evidence to suggest that this was more than a one-time event, or that other NFL franchises had similar ladies' "teams".

1930s 
A few women's football leagues emerged in the 1930s, including one in Ohio in 1934 and another in Los Angeles in 1939, but were short-lived.

1960s and 1970s 
The women's game started to formalize in the 1960s, after entrepreneur Sid Friedman founded the Women's Professional Football League in 1965.

Leagues

Leagues play American football unless otherwise noted.

United States

IconWFA Premier League of Texas (IWFA) (8 on 8)
Women's Football Alliance (WFA)
United States Women's Football League (USWFL)
Extreme Football League (X League - Formerly Legends Football League)
Women's National Football Conference (WNFC)
Xtreme Female Football League of Texas (XFFL) (8 on 8)
Women's Tackle Football League (WTFL)
Utah Girls Football League (GFL) (youth/high school level)

Canada
Maritime Women's Football League (MWFL) (Canadian football)
Western Women's Canadian Football League (WWCFL) (Canadian football)
Central Canadian Women's Football League (CCWFL) (Canadian football)

Australia
Gridiron Australia 
Female Gridiron League of Queensland
Ladies Football League
Ladies Gridiron League
Women's Gridiron Leagues of Australia
Gridiron West (WA)
Gridiron NSW

Europe
Legends Football League Europa (LFL) (Debut 2015)
Austrian Football Division Ladies (AFL Division Ladies) (Debut 2000)
BAFA National Women’s Football League (NWFL) (BAFA Women's)

Finland

Naisten vaahteraliiga

Germany
Damenbundesliga
2. Damenbundesliga
Aufbauliga NRW

Mexico
Football Xtremo Femenil
Asociación de Football Femenil Equipado
Liga Mexicana de Football Lingerie
Pretty Girls Football League
Liga Iberoamericana de Bikini Football
Women's Football League

US Defunct Leagues
Women's Professional Football League (WPFL) 1965-1973
National Women's Football League (NWFL) 1974-1988
Western States Women's Professional Football League (WSWPFL) 1978-1980
Women's Tackle Football Association (WTFA) 1988-1990
Women's Professional Football League (WPFL) 1999-2008
National Women's Football Association (NWFA) 2000-2009
Independent Women's Football League (IWFL) 2001-2018
Women's American Football League (WAFL) 2001-2003
Women's Affiliate Football Conference (WAFC) 2002
United Women's Football League (UWFL) 2002
American Football Women's League (AFWL) 2002-2003
Women's Football Association (WFA) 2002-2003
Ladies Tackle Football League (LTFL) (Central California, disbanded circa 2004?)
Women's Football League (WFL) 2002-2007
Women's Arena Football League (WAFL) 2011-2013

Women in college and professional football

Of the women who have seen action in men's college and pro football, almost all have been in special teams positions that are protected from physical contact. The first professional player was a placekick holder (a position usually occupied by a person who holds another position on the team), while the best known female college football players were all placekickers, with all having primarily played women's soccer prior to converting.

Patricia Palinkas is on record as being the first female professional football player, having played for the Orlando Panthers of the Atlantic Coast Football League in 1970. Palinkas was a placekick holder for her placekicker husband.

On October 18, 1997, Liz Heaston became the first woman to play and score in a college football game, kicking two extra points. Prior to this game, female athletes at Duke and Louisville had come close to playing in a game but did not. In 2001, Ashley Martin became the second female athlete to score in a college football game, this time in the NCAA.

In 2003, Katie Hnida became the first woman to score in an NCAA Division I-A game. She accomplished this as placekicker for the University of New Mexico Lobos on August 30, 2003. She later became the second professional player, when she signed with the Fort Wayne FireHawks.

Julie Harshbarger, a placekicker for numerous Chicago-based Continental Indoor Football League teams, became the first female player to win a most valuable player award in an otherwise all-male league in 2014. By kicking five field goals that season, she earned the title of special teams player of the year, leading all kickers in the league in scoring; with a career spanning seven seasons, Harshbarger's career was the longest documented of any woman playing in a predominantly men's professional league.

In 2020, Sarah Fuller became the first woman to play in a Power Five football game when she took the opening kickoff of the second half of the Commodores' game against the Missouri Tigers with a 30-yard squib kick on November 28, 2020. (It is important to note that the term "Power Five" was not in use when Katie Hnida became the first woman to score in an NCAA Division I-A game in 2003; Hnida played at the Mountain West Conference, which did not have Automatic Qualifying status in the Bowl Championship Series.)

Jennifer Welter became the first female skill position player at the male professional level by playing as a running back in the Texas Revolution in 2014.

To date, no women have ever played a line position above the high school level. Holley Mangold, whose brother Nick played several years in the NFL and who herself played as a lineswoman in high school, declined to further pursue football in college, fearing she had no chance to play professionally as a woman; she later went on to become an Olympic weightlifter.

Brittanee Jacobs is the first female football coach at the collegiate level. She helped coach safeties at Central Methodist University during the 2012 season. Welter became the first female coach at the professional level when she took a preseason position with the Arizona Cardinals in 2015; a year later, Kathryn Smith, who had spent several years as a front office assistant, took a quality control coaching position with the Buffalo Bills, making her the first permanent female coach in National Football League history. In 2020, Callie Brownson became the first woman to coach an NFL position group in a regular-season game when she filled in for the Cleveland Browns tight ends coach Drew Petzing.

In 2013, Lauren Silberman became the first woman to try out at the NFL Regional Scouting Combine (2013). Silberman tried out for the NFL after playing club soccer in college and taking up kicking footballs as a hobby several months before the tryout. During her tryout, she met with medical staff to address a leg injury after making two kicks, and did not complete the remaining kicks.

International competition
The world governing body for American football associations, the International Federation of American Football (IFAF), held the first Women's World Cup in Stockholm, Sweden, in 2010. Six nations participated in the inaugural event: Austria, Canada, Finland, Germany, Sweden, and the United States. The United States won the gold by beating Canada, 66–0.  The 2013 World Championship, in Finland, was held from 30 June 2013 to 7 July 2013. The United States won gold again, beating Sweden 84-0 and Germany 107–7 in order to make it to the gold medal match with Canada, whom they beat 64–0. In the 2017 IFAF Women's World Championship, held in Canada, the six teams invited were; Australia, Canada, Finland, Great Britain, Mexico and the United States.  The United States continued their dominance, claiming gold, while Canada and Mexico won silver and bronze respectively.

IFAF has confirmed Palma, located on the Spanish island of Mallorca, Spain as host for 2021 IFAF Flag Football World Championship from October 6 to 10 2021. It will be the first time Spain has staged the World Championships which have been held since 1998. Normally conducted every two years, Denmark was scheduled to host the 2020 edition only for it to be cancelled due to the coronavirus pandemic.

See also

List of female American football players
Powderpuff (sports)
Utah Girls Tackle Football League
List of female American football teams
Women's Football in the United States

References

External links
 "Women's Professional Football" history to 2000 Stuart Kantor, ProFootballResearchers.com (PDF)
 Women's World Football Games | NFL Films Presents – YouTube
 "History of women's football (so far)" Central Florida Anarchy
 History of women's football Sacramento Sirens
 The First Women's Football Shirt website
 Women's Football Forums
 Official German website for league play
 "Women Playing American Football in North America and Internationally" Ohio Northern University

 
Variations of American football